Tremors: Shrieker Island (also known as Tremors 7 and formerly Tremors: Island Fury) is a 2020 American direct-to-video horror monster film directed by Don Michael Paul and co-written with Brian Brightly. It is the seventh film in the Tremors franchise. The film stars Michael Gross and Jon Heder.

The film was released direct-to-video on October 20, 2020, by Universal Pictures Home Entertainment.

Plot
Big game hunter Bill (Richard Brake), owner of Avex-Bio Tech, leads a hunting party with his partner Dr. Richards and best hunter Anna (Cassie Clare), where he takes wealthy participants to hunt down Graboids on Dark Island, a private area where he operates his company. Dr. Jasmine 'Jas' Welker (Caroline Langrishe) and colleague Jimmy (Jon Heder) work on the research site next to Dark Island where they were experiencing unnatural seismic vibrations. When Jas sees Bill leaving Dark Island, she along with Jimmy and her friend Ishimon set out to investigate what Bill was up to and find a dead Graboid. They attempt to flee when they realize it has given birth to Shriekers, but the Shriekers kill Ishimon. Jas, knowing what Graboids are, instructs Jimmy to use coordinates provided by her son Travis to find Burt Gummer (Michael Gross). She visits Bill at his camp and learns Bill genetically bred the Graboids on the island and made them more powerful and intelligent for his hunt. He also cut off communications so nothing would stop him and his hunting party.

Jimmy finds Burt, who has now lived in isolation as a survivalist away from the government and is content on being retired from anything related to Graboids. Jimmy informs him they need his help and Travis is unavailable due to being arrested in Mexico for smuggling shrooms. Burt reluctantly agrees when Jimmy convinces him it is his destiny. When he learns Jas is there, he nearly refuses to help due to their history and keeping Travis' birth a secret from him for so many years.

Having cleaned himself up, Burt gets to meet the crew, including tomboy Freddie (Jackie Cruz) who has a crush on Jimmy. Bill shows up to intimidate Burt and tells him to back off his hunt, but Burt is not afraid and warns Bill that the Graboids are a strong threat no matter what planning is implemented against them. Burt tries to gather weapons only to find out that they have no firearms to defend themselves, only a bunker from World War II which has machetes, two flamethrowers, and dynamite that is unstable.

On Dark Island, the Shriekers Jas and Jimmy encountered have begun killing off members of Bill’s hunting party. Eventually, they find the Shriekers, but they, like their parent Graboid, are also superior to the originals and can now use their screams as sonic emitting weapons allowing them to pick off Bill's crew one by one. They are saved when Burt and the others arrive killing the Shriekers and one Graboid, leaving two remaining Graboids. Returning to Jas' research site, they are shocked to learn one of the Graboids made it to their location, showing signs it is much more powerful than they all realized. Burt warns Bill to call off the hunt and turn the communication system back on, but he refuses. Bill tranquilizes Burt and locks him and the others in the bunker.

Awakening in the bunker, everyone has been bound with zip ties. When Jimmy looks at Burt's boots, he remembers that he loaned them to Burt and that he had the laces replaced with paracord, allowing Burt to cut the zip ties off. Meanwhile, Bill's hunt continues but goes horribly wrong when the Graboid that made it to Jas' site earlier has shown up and is subsequently dubbed "The Queen" due to its superiority. Anna quits when Bill's lust for the hunt proves too dangerous and insane.

Anna frees Burt and the others from the bunker, but they are attacked by a Graboid before they can leave. They use the dynamite to blow it up leaving only The Queen. Burt locates Bill to reason with him but is unable to convince him to give up his hunt. Bill meets his demise when The Queen finds them and devours Bill. Burt realizes The Queen is killing the weakest off until Burt, who Jimmy points out must be the Alpha, is left remaining. Burt gathers the remaining survivors and, inspired by the way his friends Valentine McKee and Earl Bassett successfully killed off an intelligent Graboid in his very first encounter with the creatures (Tremors), they plan to lead The Queen to an inactive volcano dubbed Devil's Punchbowl and lure The Queen over a plateau onto a bed of spiked dynamite.

Burt and Jimmy leave to kill off the remaining Shriekers, while Jas and the others set up the trap for The Queen. Burt and Jimmy make it to Dark Island and begin killing off the Shriekers with the bunker weapons.

They return to the research site, but find out The Queen is there waiting for Burt. The team heads to Devil's Punchbowl to execute the plan with Jimmy following behind Burt. The pair are successfully leading The Queen into the trap, but Burt, at the last second, pushes Jimmy out of the way and lets himself be swallowed by The Queen to ensure her demise. The Queen dies from the dynamite and spikes, and Burt does not survive, much to the sadness of Jas and the others. In the end, they make a memorial for Burt, leaving behind their weapons with his signature hat and sunglasses.

During the credits, scenes of Burt Gummer from all the previous  Tremors films are montaged.

Cast
 Michael Gross as Burt Gummer
 Jon Heder as Jimmy
 Jackie Cruz as Freddie
 Richard Brake as Bill
 Caroline Langrishe as Jasmine "Jas" Welker
 Cassie Clare as Anna
 Sahajak Boonthanakit as Mr. Bowtie
 Matthew Douglas as Dr. Richards
 Randy Kalsi as Wall Street
 David Assavanon as Pretty Boy
 Boonma Lamphon as Ishimon
 Iris Park as Researcher Iris
 Aukrawut Rojaunawat as Parkour boy
 Bear Williams as Mohawk
 Mikey Black as Researcher Mikey

Production

Development
On December 13, 2018, Michael Gross confirmed that Universal Pictures had ordered a seventh entry in the series and that he would return to star, stating "Tremors fans will be delighted to know I have just agreed to the terms of a contract for a seventh film. My best estimate is that Burt Gummer will begin his hunt for Graboids and other nefarious forms of wildlife in the fall of 2019."

Filming
Principal photography began on November 13, 2019, in Thailand, under the working title of Island Fury, with Alexander Krumov serving as cinematographer. On November 26, 2019, Jon Heder, Jackie Cruz, and Richard Brake signed on to star alongside Gross. On December 12, 2019, Gross confirmed that filming had wrapped.

Post-production
In August 2020, the film was officially titled Tremors: Shrieker Island. Jamie Kennedy, who portrayed Burt Gummer's son Travis B. Welker, in Tremors 5: Bloodlines and Tremors: A Cold Day in Hell, did not reprise the role in Shrieker Island.

Release
Tremors: Shrieker Island was released direct-to-video on October 20, 2020, by Universal Pictures Home Entertainment.

Reception

Critical response
In a positive review, Sean Chandler, of Sean Chandler Talks About, gave the film a "B−", saying "Tremors: Shrieker Island is not great cinema, but it is a fun creature feature." Sol Harris, of Starburst gave the film 3 stars out of 5, feeling that there was "plenty of Graboid action, a handful of great gags and a surprisingly emotional climax ultimately renders Tremors: Shrieker Island closer to perfection than you might think." Josh Bell, of Crooked Marquee, gave the film a "C", saying that while the film "isn't a particularly good movie, it's a nice showcase for a character who has become an unlikely cinematic institution."

In a negative review, John Squires of Bloody Disgusting gave the film 2.5 stars out of 5, saying "There's clearly just not enough money at the disposal of the filmmakers to do anything more with the franchise than they've already done." Roger Moore, of Movie Nation, gave the film a 1.5/4, saying "if you want a scary, tense and hilarious movie about giant worms eating desert California, rent the original Tremors, directed by Ron Underwood, starring Kevin Bacon, Fred Ward, Michael Gross and Reba McEntire. No Shrieker necessary." AllHorror.com also gave a negative review, stating that "Tremors: Shrieker Island did something the Tremors franchise never did before, it became an entirely different movie. Shrieker Island is basically Jurassic Park. Swap out a Graboid for a T-Rex and you have Jurassic Park starring Burt Gummer and Napoleon Dynamite." Clarisse Loughery, of The Independent, gave the film a 2/5, saying "It may speak eloquently to its fanbase, but it's guaranteed to baffle any outsider".

Revenue

Tremors: Shrieker Island earned $2,348,198 from domestic home video sales.

Possible Sequel 
In a podcast with Bloody Disgusting, Gross mentioned that "part of me that feels that Universal Home Entertainment might've had enough of Tremors", though he followed up by saying "The door is still open for an eighth Tremors. It may seem unlikely by what people see on the screen, but it is possible. There could be an eighth. And if there were, and if it were an interesting story, I would be up for it because Burt is always a great deal of fun. It would depend on his physicality. How much they want me to do. If it's in another two years, I'll be 75 years old. So I will continue to hope and pray that I stay in shape, to do what is asked of me – if it is asked of me." Gross later said on Facebook "There are no guarantees, but for those who wonder aloud if this is the final film, I will say what I have said before: SALES drive sequels. Show biz is 5% show and 95% business, so if this latest addition to the Tremors franchise, sells well, Universal Studios Hollywood will follow the money, and Universal Pictures Home Entertainment may will [sic] be back for more."

References

External links
 

2020 action thriller films
2020 direct-to-video films
2020 films
2020 science fiction action films
2020s science fiction thriller films
2020s monster movies
American action thriller films
American monster movies
American satirical films
American science fiction action films
American science fiction thriller films
Direct-to-video action films
Direct-to-video science fiction films
Direct-to-video sequel films
Films directed by Don Michael Paul
Films scored by Frederik Wiedmann
Films set on fictional islands
Films shot in Thailand
Tremors (franchise)
Universal Pictures direct-to-video films
2020s English-language films
2020s American films